Hampton Bays is a railroad station along the Montauk Branch of the Long Island Rail Road. It is on Good Ground Road between Springville Road and Suffolk CR 32 (Ponquogue Avenue) in Hampton Bays, New York.

History
The Hampton Bays station was originally built along what was then the Sag Harbor Branch on December 20, 1869 (although some sources claim it was in February 1871) as "Good Ground." It was the terminus of the line until the summer of 1870 when it was extended to Sag Harbor. The station was renamed "Hampton Bays" in June 1922, but the original name can be found along one of the streets where it is located on. The station burned on November 4, 1873. The second station was opened on January 10, 1874 and closed in 1913, but used as an "express house" for the 3rd depot, which opened in the Summer 1913. The station house was built in the style typical of stations such as Manhasset, Riverhead, Bay Shore, Northport, and Mineola stations, and closed in 1958, but remained a flag stop, then razed sometime around 1964. When Quogue station was closed on March 16, 1998, Hampton Bays was one of the two stations that replaced it. The other was Westhampton. The existing depot's high-level platforms were added between 1998 and 1999.

Station layout
The station has one six-car-long high-level side platform on the north side of the main track. A siding is on the south side of the main track.

References

External links 

Unofficial LIRR History Website
1915 Post Card
February 2000 Photo
Unofficial LIRR Photography Site
Hampton Bays Station
 Station from Ponoquogue Avenue from Google Maps Street View

Long Island Rail Road stations in Suffolk County, New York

The Hamptons, New York
Railway stations in the United States opened in 1869